The 1st Youth in Film Awards ceremony (now known as the Young Artist Awards), presented by the Youth in Film Association, honored outstanding youth performers in the fields of film, television and music for the 1978–1979 season, and took place in October 1979 at the Sheraton Universal Hotel in Universal City, California.

Established in 1978 by long-standing Hollywood Foreign Press Association member, Maureen Dragone, the Youth in Film Association was the first organization to establish an awards ceremony specifically set to recognize and award the contributions of performers under the age of 21 in the fields of film, television, theater and music.

Although the Youth in Film Awards were conceived as a way to primarily recognize youth performers under the age of 18, the eldest winner in a competitive category at the 1st annual ceremony was Dennis Christopher who was 23 years old on the night he won as Best Juvenile Actor in a Motion Picture for his performance in Breaking Away.

Categories
★ Bold indicates the winner in each category.

Best Young Performer in a Feature Film

Best Juvenile Actor in A Motion Picture
★ Dennis Christopher – Breaking Away – 20th Century Fox
Thelonious Bernard – A Little Romance – Warner Bros
Panchito Gomez – Walk Proud –  Universal
Jeremy Levy – Rich Kids –  United Artists
Ricky Schroder – The Champ – MGM

Best Juvenile Actress in A Motion Picture
★ Diane Lane – A Little Romance – Warner Bros
Trini Alvarado – Rich Kids – United Artists
Mariel Hemingway – Manhattan – United Artists
Patsy Kensit – Hanover Street – Columbia
Brooke Shields – Just You and Me, Kid – Columbia
Cindy Smith – Benji's Very Own Christmas Story – Mulberry Square

Best Young Performer in a TV Series or Special

Best Juvenile Actor in A TV Series or Special
★ Adam Rich – Eight is Enough – ABC
Willie Aames – Eight is Enough – ABC
Shaun Cassidy – Like Normal People – ABC
Gary Coleman – Diff'rent Strokes – NBC
Noah Hathaway – Battlestar Galactica – Universal

Best Juvenile Actress in a TV Series or Special
★ Charlene Tilton – Dallas (Royal Marriage segment) – CBS
Danielle Brisebois – All in the Family – CBS
Quinn Cummings – Family – ABC
Melissa Gilbert – Little House on the Prairie – NBC
Kristy McNichol – Family – ABC

Best Young Performer in a TV Daytime Series

Best Juvenile Actor in A Daytime Series
★ Meegan King – Days of Our Lives – NBC
Shawn Campbell – The Doctors – NBC
Mikey Martin – Days of Our Lives – NBC

Best Juvenile Actress in A Daytime Series
★ Tracey Bregman – Days of Our Lives – NBC
Genie Francis – General Hospital – ABC
Natasha Ryan – Days of Our Lives – NBC

Best Young Musical Recording Artist

Best Juvenile Musical Recording Artist – Male
★ Michael Jackson – Off the Wall – Epic
Shaun Cassidy – Room Service – Warner Bros.
Jimmy Osmond (with The Osmonds) – Steppin' Out – Mercury

Best Juvenile Musical Recording Artist – Female
★ Evelyn "Champagne" King – Shame – RCA
Marie Osmond (with The Osmonds) – Steppin' Out – Mercury

Best Entertainment Featuring Youth

Best Motion Picture Featuring Youth
★ A Little Romance – WB
Breaking Away – 20th Century Fox
The Champ – MGM
Nutcracker Fantasy – Sanrio Communications
The Muppet Movie – Marble Arch

Best TV Series or Special Featuring Youth
★ ''Eight is Enough – ABCBenji's Very Own Christmas Story – Mulberry Square
Diff'rent Strokes – NBC
Little House on the Prairie – NBC
The Waltons – CBS

Best Musical Entertainment Featuring Youth – TV or Motion Picture
★ Nutcracker Fantasy – Sanrio CommunicationsHair – United Artists
Sha Na Na – NBC
Sleeping Beauty 1979 re-release – Disney
The Muppet Movie – Marble Arch

Special awards
Jane Withers Award
Best Juvenile Comedian
★ Gary Coleman – Diff'rent Strokes – NBCThe Sybil Jason Award
Best Juvenile Actress in a Motion Picture
★ Diane Lane – A Little Romance – WBThe Jackie Coogan Award
Best Juvenile Actor in a Motion Picture
★ Thelonious Bernard – A Little Romance'' – WB

Former Child Star Lifetime Achievement Award
★ Jane Withers

References

External links
Official site

Young Artist Awards ceremonies
1979 film awards
1979 television awards
1979 in American cinema
1979 in American television
1979 in California